Jet America Airlines was an airline that operated domestic flights in the United States between 1981 and 1987. It was headquartered in Signal Hill, California, near Long Beach.

History
Jet America acquired its name from the existing Jet America, Inc., a charter operator of six Lear Jets based in Washington, DC.  Headed by executives from AirCal and Air Florida, the airline began operating on November 16, 1981, with a flight from its home base at Long Beach Airport (LGB) to Chicago O'Hare International Airport (ORD).  The airline later added service to five other destinations and subsequently introduced flights to other cities as well. The airline operated a fleet of eight McDonnell Douglas MD-82 aircraft, plus two Boeing 707 aircraft which were based in Philadelphia during the summer of 1984 for charter work.

In 1985 Jet America joined with Disney to advertise a direct route from Dallas/Fort Worth International Airport (DFW) to Long Beach Airport for people to visit Disneyland in its 30th anniversary year. Many of these ads were played during Texas Rangers baseball games or were placed in the team's programs and calendar.  Also in 1985, the airline was operating nonstop service between Chicago O'Hare International Airport and Long Beach, Oakland and St. Louis.

In the summer of 1986, Jet America was operating a small hub at the Las Vegas McCarran International Airport (LAS) with nonstop jet service to Burbank (BUR), Chicago (ORD), Dallas/Ft. Worth (DFW), Long Beach (LGB), Milwaukee (MKE), Ontario (ONT), Orange County (SNA) and St. Louis (STL) as well as direct one stop flights to Detroit (DTW) and Washington, D.C. (DCA).

In the spring of 1987, the airline was operating direct, no change of plane service between the west coast and the east coast of the U.S. including a round trip multi-stop flight with a routing of Orange County (SNA) - Portland (PDX) - Seattle (SEA) - Minneapolis/St. Paul (MSP) - Washington, D.C. (DCA) as well as  a Long Beach (LGB) - Chicago (ORD) - Washington, D.C. (DCA) round trip flight.

Late in 1986, the airline received buyout offers from Delta Air Lines and Alaska Air Group. The airline accepted Alaska Airlines' bid and by the end of the year the acquisition had been completed.  After initially attempting to operate the two airlines separately but finding it costly to do so, Jet America was merged into Alaska Airlines on October 1, 1987.

Destinations in 1987
In June 1987 shortly before it was acquired by Alaska Airlines, Jet America was serving eleven destinations in the United States:
California
Long Beach (Long Beach Airport) - LGB
Orange County (John Wayne Airport) - SNA

Illinois
Chicago (O'Hare International Airport) - ORD

Minnesota
Minneapolis/Saint Paul (Minneapolis-Saint Paul International Airport) - MSP

Missouri
St. Louis (Lambert-St. Louis International Airport) - STL

Oregon
Portland (Portland International Airport) - PDX

Texas
Dallas/Fort Worth (Dallas/Fort Worth International Airport) - DFW

Michigan
Detroit, Michigan (Detroit Metropolitan Wayne County Airport) - DTW

Washington, DC
Washington, DC (Ronald Reagan Washington National Airport) - DCA

Washington
Seattle/Tacoma (Seattle-Tacoma International Airport) - SEA

Nevada
Las Vegas (McCarran International Airport) - LAS

Previous destinations

Jet America also previously served the following destinations during its existence:

California
 Burbank (Bob Hope Airport) - BUR
 Fresno (Fresno Yosemite International Airport) - FAT
 Oakland (Oakland International Airport) - OAK
 Ontario (Ontario International Airport) - ONT

Wisconsin
 Milwaukee (General Mitchell International Airport) - MKE

Fleet

Jet America operated a total of ten aircraft:

See also 
 List of defunct airlines of the United States

References

Defunct airlines of the United States
Defunct companies based in Greater Los Angeles
Signal Hill, California
Airlines established in 1980
Airlines disestablished in 1987
1980 establishments in California
1987 disestablishments in California